The Majlis Ugama Islam Singapura (MUIS), also known as the Islamic Religious Council of Singapore (IRCS), is a statutory board of the Ministry of Culture, Community and Youth of the Government of Singapore. As a majlis, its role is to look after the administration and interests of Singapore's Muslim community. The Majlis is headed by a Council, in which members are appointed by the President of Singapore. Since 2009, the council is headquartered in the Singapore Islamic Hub, along Braddell Road.

History and role

MUIS was established in 1968 when the Administration of Muslim Law Act (AMLA) came into effect.

The principal functions of MUIS are:

 Administration of Muslim affairs e.g. zakat, wakaf (endowment), pilgrimage affairs, and halal certification
 Construction and administration of mosques development and management
 Administration of Madrasah and Islamic education
 Issuance of fatwas (religious rulings)
 Provision of financial relief to poor Muslims

Under AMLA, MUIS is a statutory board of the Singapore Government. It comes under the Ministry of Culture, Community and Youth, and under the direct supervision of the Minister-In-Charge of Muslim Affairs. 
 
Its primary statutory role is to advise the President of Singapore on all Islamic matters as well as the religious interests and issues faced by the Muslim Community in Singapore.

The Council of MUIS

The Council of MUIS operates as the overall decision-making body and has responsibility for the formulation of policies and operational plans.

The Council comprises the President of MUIS, the Mufti of Singapore, persons recommended by the Minister-in-Charge of Muslim Affairs and other persons nominated by Muslim organisations. The President of Singapore appoints all members of the Council.

 Haji Mohd Alami Musa serves as President of MUIS and Mohamed Fatris bin Bakaram as the Mufti of Singapore.

Singapore Fatwa Committee

Full Members
 Mufti Nazirudin Mohd Nasir, Chairman
 Ustaz Ali Bin Hj Mohamed
 Ustaz Mohamad Hasbi Bin Hassan
 Ustaz Fathurrahman Bin Hj M Dawoed
 Ustazah Rohana Binte Ithnin

Associate Members
 (Secretary) Ustaz Mohd Murat Bin Md Aris, Deputy Mufti
 Ustaz Mohammad Hannan Bin Hassan, Deputy Mufti
 Ustaz Badrul Fata Bin Muhd Ridwan, Islamic Studies Teacher, Madrasah Irsyad Zuhri
 Ustaz Firdaus Yahya, Founder and Manager, Darul Huffaz Learning Centre
 Ustaz Mohamed Bin Ali, Assistant Professor at Studies in Inter-Religious Relations in Plural Societies (SRP) Programme, S. Rajaratnam School of International Studies (RSIS)
 Ustaz Mohammad Rizhan Bin Leman, Lecturer, Institut Pengajian Tinggi Al-Zuhri
 Ustazah Sakinah Binte Saptu, Freelance Asatizah
 Ustaz Shaik Ahmad Bin Syed Buhari, Specialist, Breast Surgery and Oncoplastic Surgery
 Ustaz Ahmad Haris Bin Suhaimi, Freelance Asatizah
 Ustaz Irwan Hadi Bin Mohd Shuhaimy, Deputy Director, Office of Mufti
 Ustaz Kamaruzaman Bin Afandi, Assistant Director, Assessment, ARS Office
 Ustaz Mahmoud Mathlub Bin Sidek, Deputy Director, Office of Mufti (Asatizah Recognition)
 Ustaz Mohammad Yusri Yubhi Bin Mohd Yusoff, Director, YusriYusoff Consulting
 Ustaz Mohd Kamal Bin Mokhtar, Judge, Shariah Appeal Court of Singapore
 Ustaz Muhammad Ma'az Bin Sallim, Executive Imam, Masjid Al-Istighfar
 Ustaz Muhammad Saiful 'Adli Bin Ayob, Senior Executive, Assessment, ARS Office
 Ustaz Muhammad Tarmizi Bin Abdul Wahid, Business Advisor, Ra'e Ventures Sdn Bhd
 Ustazah Nadia Hanim Binte Abdul Rahman, Member of Asatizah Youth Network (AYN)
 Ustazah Siti Nur 'Alaniah Binte Abdul Wahid, Founder & Director, Caliph Consultancy

Singapore Islamic Hub
The Singapore Islamic Hub is a religious campus that houses Masjid Muhajirin, Madrasah Irsyad Zuhri Al-Islamiah and the headquarters of Majlis Ugama Islam Singapura (Muis). These institutions combined (mosque, madrasa and majlis) create a cohesive and symbiotic whole, embodies the Islamic principles of Iman, Ilmu and Amal (Faith, Knowledge and Deeds) respectively.

Halal Certifications
The MUIS Halal services formally started in 1978. The increasing demand for Halal-certified products and eating establishments, as well as the need to regulate the Halal industry drove the move to set up its Halal Certification Strategic Unit.

In 2009, Muis certified more than 2,600 premises and has played an important role as the custodian of Halal food assurance for Singapore’s 15% Muslim population. Furthermore, the promising Halal food industry with the availability of many Halal-certified eating establishments has helped to foster social interaction between individuals from diverse racial, cultural and religious backgrounds.

See also

 Islam in Singapore
 List of mosques in Singapore
 Majlis

References

External links
Majlis Ugama Islam Singapura

Islam in Singapore
Religious organisations based in Singapore
Statutory boards of the Singapore Government
1968 establishments in Singapore
Government agencies established in 1968